Masterpiece is a 2015 Indian Kannada-language action film written and directed by Manju Mandavya. This film was released on 24 December 2015, starring Yash and Shanvi Srivastava in the lead roles, it also features Suhasini Maniratnam, P. Ravi Shankar and Chikkanna in the supporting roles, the music is composed by V. Harikrishna. The film was released on 24 December 2015.

Plot
Yuva is a local troublemaker who is living with his mother Durga, his sister, and sister's son Lochan. Durga disapproves of many of Yuva's antics where she reads him stories of Subhash Chandra Bose, Chandrashekhar Azad and Bhagat Singh when Yuva was a child, in the hope that he would one day become like them. However, Yuva is exact opposite. Consequently, she gives a TV interview about his upbringing and how his actions have not been good, thus giving the public an impression that Yuva is a rogue. Yuva and his friend Bruce Lee help Noor Ahmed, a local politician, to get elected in college and local elections, thus gaining political connections in the process. Alongside this, Yuva falls in love with a carefree girl named Nisha. When Nisha gets caught in the middle of a chase between the police and a gangster known as Boss, Yuva knocks Boss unconscious, sending him into a coma.

After Boss is admitted to the hospital, Yuva's family begins to be threatened by various actions by Boss's henchman. Yuva's nephew Lochan is kidnapped and returned later that day unharmed. Durga gets locked in a storage closet in a temple where Yuva saves her from intoxication. Yuva lodges a complaint to the police commissioner, only to be mocked since the police had saw his interview. Yuva realises that his family is in danger and begins to change his laid-back attitude. When Yuva and Nisha visit a mall, Nisha disappears and Yuva receives a phone call from Boss's brother Danny; in order to save Nisha, he must help Boss escape from the hospital. Yuva does what is told, but is knocked unconscious along with Nisha, and Yuva is later framed as a drug smuggler. Noor Ahmed and Bruce Lee take Yuva and Nisha to their hideout, where they watch Durga wishes for Yuva to be encounter killed by the police, before a commotion breaks out against Durga. 

Yuva realizes that his family has been disrespected and plots to prove his innocence by capturing Boss and his men. Yuva captures Boss, along with Danny and his right-hand men. Yuva and Bruce Lee decides to record a video before finishing them. While Bruce Lee is recording the whole incident, Boss admits that he had corrupt cops supporting him the whole time in the cocaine trade and proclaims that India can't change. Yuva realizes Boss's point of view and takes up a stand, revealing that while he initially set out to make his mother proud, Now, he is set on making his motherland proud by proclaiming that illegal drugs will no longer be available in local stores. Yuva kills Boss and his men in Dirty Harry-style, causing him to get arrested. The video goes viral throughout the country, causing widespread support for Yuva. Durga visits him in prison and feeds carrot halwa to him; as she leaves, she finally sees Bhagat Singh in her son and becomes a proud mother.

Cast
 Yash as Yuva
 Shanvi Srivastava as Nisha, Yuva's love interest 
 Suhasini Maniratnam as Durga, Yuva's mother
 Ravishankar as Boss, a drug mafia don 
 Chikkanna as Bruce Lee, Yuva's friend 
 Ananth Padmanabha as Burce Lee's Friend 
 Achyuth Kumar as Noor Ahmed
 Avinash as Police Commissioner
 Anil Kumar as Gooli Shankar
 Ekta Rathod in a Mallige (cameo appearance)
 Ayyappa P Sharma as Danny, Boss's younger brother
 Vijay Kashi as Nisha's father
 Dhanush as himself

Production
The film was announced on 21 October 2014, to coincide with the occasion of Deepavali, a Hindu festival, by film producer Vijay Kiragandur. The film would be titled Masterpiece and would be produced under his banner, Hombale Films. Manju Mandavya made his directorial debut, who also wrote the screenplay and dialogues for the film. On titling the film as Masterpiece, he said, "Masterpiece was a spontaneous title that somehow clicked when I was getting into the structure of the story and when the hero's character was developing in my mind." V. Harikrishna was chosen to compose the music for the film and Vaidhy was chosen as cinematographer.

Casting
During the announcement, it was also announced that Yash would play the lead role in the film and that Suhasini Maniratnam would portray the role of his mother. The director said that two actresses, Anushka Shetty and Priya Anand, were under consideration to play the female lead. Following speculations, Shanvi Srivastava was signed in late-December 2014. Chikkanna was cast in an important side role marking his 25th film in acting.

Filming and development
Filming was scheduled to begin in November or early-December 2014, following the filming of Mr. and Mrs. Ramachari, another Yash-starrer. While delayed, reports said filming was to begin in the second week of January 2015. In June 2015, it was revealed that model Ekta Rathod would make a cameo appearance in the film. In the midst of filming, The New Indian Express carried a report in July suggesting that Yash could be playing a negative role in the film, which however was not confirmed by the makers. in the course of filming in September, it was revealed that the film would incorporate elements from the life story of a revolutionary leader of British India, Bhagat Singh. A schedule in Mysore was completed, following which the song sequences were filmed.

A celebratory song was filmed across Bengaluru, and the song appears in the movie when Yash's character falls in love. The song also features Chikkanna and Shanvi Srivastava, and over 1,500 backup dancers. The song Annange Love Aagide turned into a chartbuster.

Soundtrack

The background music and soundtracks are composed by V. Harikrishna, with lyrics for the soundtrack penned by Manju Mandavya, Narthan and Ghouse Peer.

The audio launch event of Masterpiece was supposed to happen in a unique way, For the first-time the team members of Masterpiece had planned for an interesting audio release. Masterpiece music album includes 5 songs and was supposed to be released on 5 different days, starting from 2 December as follows: "Annange Love Aagidhe" (2 Dec), "I Can't Wait Baby" (4 Dec),
"KD NO 1" (7 Dec), "Jaago Re Jaago" (8 Dec), "Attention Please" and trailer (10 Dec).

Reception

Critical response 

Arachana Nathan of The Hindu wrote" Masterpiece also attacks those who do not know Kannada. A Russian working as a masseuse in Goa is told to learn Kannada through an app because she ‘massages’ five people a day and knows only four languages. Masterpiece is definitely one of a kind. Not necessarily in a good way." Shashi Prasad of Deccan Chronicle scored the film at 3 out of 5 stars and says "The veteran Suhasini is at her usual best, and the humour part is again made enjoyable by Chikkanna with his natural abilities. It is a must for Yash fans and for the actual movie buffs, better wait for the intermission. Till then enjoy Yash advertising himself as ‘Rocking Star,’ and couple of fresh scenes, dance and the cute ghost!" A Shardhha of The New Indian Express wrote "The obvious flaw in the film is the second half, which could have continued with the momentum built in the first half. But instead, it sways away to get into a cat and mouse chase scenario, slowly losing the intensity." Shyam Prasad S of Bangalore Mirror scored the film at 3.5 out of 5 stars and says "There are the good songs, eye-candy locales and the chest-thumping dialogues. All this works with those enamoured by Yash, the rest can chill somewhere else."

References

External links
 

2010s Kannada-language films
2015 films
Films scored by V. Harikrishna
2015 action thriller films
Indian action thriller films
Films shot in Bangalore
Films shot in Dubai
Films shot in Mysore
Films set in Bangalore
2015 masala films